Ben Batt (born 7 February 1986) is an English actor, best known for his role as the villainous Joe Pritchard in Channel 4's comedy drama Shameless. He has also appeared in Scott & Bailey as DC Kevin Lumb, Alf Rutter in The Village and in Sirens as Craig Scruton, the fireman. He starred as Ted Burgess in the BBC production of The Go-Between broadcast on 20 September 2015. In the 2011 film Weekender set within the late 1980s rave culture he played the main antagonist John Anderson.

He has also had many smaller roles, such as in Captain America: The First Avenger as an Enlistment Office MP and in The Promise as Private Derek Toogood. Other minor parts include roles in Accused, Salvage, Wire in the Blood, Lewis, Casualty, The Edge of Love, Spooks: Code 9 and Death in Paradise. In season 3 of Jamestown (2019), Batt played Willmus Crabtree, a mysterious trader from England with his motives and intentions unknown.  
In 2016 he starred as Stanley Kowalski in A Streetcar Named Desire by Tennessee Williams at the Royal Exchange, Manchester which was directed by Sarah Frankcom.

Stage credits

Filmography

Film

Television

Personal life
Batt was born in Wigan, to parents Alan and Holly, the only boy in a family of three, with an older sister, Sarah, and a younger sister, Holly. He played for Orrell and Lancashire https://en.wikipedia.org/wiki/Rugby teams as a child. He attended Shevington High School. After sustaining an injury he began acting and enrolled at London's Guildhall School of Music and Drama. He left when he was offered a small role in the film The Edge of Love in 2008.

His partner is Shameless co-star, Rebecca Atkinson, who played Karen Maguire. They met on the set in 2008 and shared numerous storylines together. In 2016, Atkinson gave birth to their son, Jack.

References

External links
 
 http://www.digitalspy.co.uk/tv/news/a215521/shameless-ben-batt-stopped-by-volcano.html

Living people
1986 births
English male television actors
English male film actors
People from Wigan
21st-century English male actors
Alumni of the Guildhall School of Music and Drama